Smoke in tha City is the ninth studio album by American rapper MC Eiht, released September 14, 2004 on Factor House Records.  It was produced by Black C-Zer and Quincy Miller. The album featuring guest performances by West Coast heavy-weights: RBX, Spice 1, Kokane, Jayo Felony and Daz Dillinger.

Track listing
"Stand Up" (featuring RBX)
"Do Compton"
"I'm That"
"My Nine Mil" (featuring Daz Dillinger) 
"Every Day" (featuring Kenyatta) 
"Get at Me"
"She Likes Gurlz" (featuring Rezee, Boki & Kenyatta)
"Don't Play" (featuring The Game)
"Whateva You Do" (featuring Kenyatta) 
"8 Seconds"
"Don't Move" (featuring Jayo Felony) 
"Some Don't Make It" (featuring Menace & Kenyatta) 
"Killin Folks" (featuring Young Buck & Skip) 
"U Owe Me"
"They Hatin"
"Thats My Sh*T"(featuring Spice 1 & Boki) 
"We Don't Like You" (featuring Danisha) 
"U Got Me F*%#'d Up" (featuring Rezee, Menace & Kokane) 
"When I Go"

External links 
 [ Smoke in tha City] at Allmusic
 Smoke in tha City at Tower Records

MC Eiht albums
2004 albums